The Municipality of Trujillo is the Peruvian public institution of government for Trujillo Province, Peru. It is located in the city of Trujillo and is responsible for the supply and management of the province and its districts. This includes rural and urban towns and the provision of local services within its jurisdiction. It is a politically autonomous legal entity and as such it deals with economic and administrative matters.

History
The first Cabildo (council) in Trujillo was commenced on March 5, 1535 by Francisco Pizarro. Pizarro appointed Martin de Estete as Lieutenant Governor and Rodrigo Lozano and Blas de Atienza as mayors. Alonso de Alvarado, Garcia Contreras, Diego Verdejo, Pedro Mato and Pedro de Villafranca were appointed as counselors. Since 2010, it has celebrated the One Week Anniversary of Trujillo Municipality in honor of the act.

Structure
The Council, composed of the mayor and aldermen, is the regulatory and supervisory agency. The Mayor runs the executive agency. Other groups include the Local Coordinating Council (provincial or district) and neighborhood boards.

The executive includesmMunicipal management, internal audit, the public attorney, the office of legal counsel and the office of planning and budget.

Related Companies
SEDALIB, provider of water supply and sanitation in La Libertad Region. 
Caja Trujillo, banking institution.

See also

Historic Centre of Trujillo
Chan Chan
Huanchaco
Puerto Chicama
Chimu
Pacasmayo beach
Plaza de Armas of Trujillo
Moche
Víctor Larco Herrera District
Vista Alegre
Buenos Aires
Las Delicias beach
Independence of Trujillo
Wall of Trujillo
Santiago de Huamán
Lake Conache
Marinera Festival
Trujillo Spring Festival
Wetlands of Huanchaco
Association of Breeders and Owners of Paso Horses in La Libertad
Salaverry beach
Puerto Morín
Virú culture
Marcahuamachuco
Wiracochapampa

External links

Map of Trujillo (Wikimapia)
"Huaca de la luna and Huaca del sol"
"Huacas del Sol y de la Luna Archaeological Complex", Official Website
Information on El Brujo Archaeological Complex
Chan Chan World Heritage Site, UNESCO
Chan Chan conservation project
Website about Trujillo, Reviews, Events, Business Directory
Municipality of Trujillo

Multimedia
 
 
 
 Gallery pictures of Trujillo by Panoramio, Includes Geographical information by various authors
Colonial Trujillo photos

References

Trujillo, Peru